The Kerjaya LRT station is a light rapid transit (LRT) station that serve the suburb of Shah Alam in Selangor, Malaysia. It serves as one of the stations on the Shah Alam line. The station is an elevated rapid transit station in Glenmarie, Shah Alam, Selangor, Malaysia, forming part of the Klang Valley Integrated Transit System.

The station is marked as Station No. 9 along the RM9 billion line project with the line's maintenance depot located in Johan Setia, Klang. The Kerjaya LRT station is expected to be operational in February 2024 and will have facilities such as public parking, kiosks, restrooms, elevators, taxi stand and feeder bus among others.

Locality landmarks
 Politeknik Premier Sultan Salahuddin Abdul Aziz Shah
 HICOM-Glenmarie Industrial Park
 Kolej Komuniti Shah Alam
 UOW-KDU University Malaysia
 The Glenz-Glenmarie Condominium
 Utropolis Marketplace Shopping Mall
 Utropolis Urbano residential
 Montfort Boys Town Training Institute
 Pangsapuri Sri Kerjaya

References

External links
 LRT3 Bandar Utama–Klang line

Rapid transit stations in Selangor
Shah Alam Line